Deathbringer or Death Bringer may refer to:

 Deathbringer (1991 video game), by Oxford Digital Enterprises
 Death Bringer or Galdregon's Domain, a 1988 video game by Pandora
 Skulduggery Pleasant: Death Bringer, a 2011 novel in the Skulduggery Pleasant series of fantasy novels by Irish author Derek Landy
 A sword owned by American comic book character Lady Death
 A character in the 1989 video game Golden Axe
 A character in certain DC comics involving the superhero Hawkman
Name of a fictional Dragon who is featured in the Wings of Fire series

See also
 The Three Deathbringers, an idea from Taoism that relates to the Chinese deity Siming